Number 209 Squadron of the British Royal Air Force was originally formed from a nucleus of "Naval Eight" on 1 February 1917 at Saint-Pol-sur-Mer, France, as No. 9 Squadron Royal Naval Air Service (RNAS) and saw active service in both World Wars, the Korean War and in Malaya. The use of the squadron number ceased in 1968 and it has not been reused since by an RAF squadron. However the number, badge and motto is in current service within the RAF Air Cadets at 209 (West Bridgford) Squadron ATC in Nottinghamshire.

History

Formation and World War I
The Squadron was formed as a Royal Air Force Squadron on 1 April 1918, from No. 9 Squadron, Royal Naval Air Service at Clairmarais aerodrome. (All former RNAS squadrons were renumbered by the addition of 200 to their RNAS number.) During the remainder of World War I, 209 Squadron flew Sopwith Camels over the Western Front on fighter and ground support missions. The Squadron badge, the falling red eagle, symbolizes the destruction of Baron Manfred von Richthofen (commonly known as The Red Baron) who, in the 1914–1918 War, was credited to the guns of a pilot, Roy Brown from No. 209 Squadron. On 21 January 1919, the squadron was reduced to a skeleton organisation and disbanded in the UK on 24 June 1919 at RAF Scopwick, Lincolnshire.

The interbellum
No. 209 reformed at the flying boat base at RAF Mount Batten, Plymouth on 15 January 1930. It was first equipped with Blackburn Iris flying boats and then from January 1934 by Blackburn Perth but neither of these types were built in sufficient quantities to equip the squadron fully. In July 1936, however, the squadron was fully equipped with Short Singapore Mk.IIIs and it was transferred to RAF Kalafrana, Malta in September 1937 for three months. In December 1938, No 209 began to convert to yet another flying boat type, the Supermarine Stranraer.

World War II

When the Second World War broke out, No.209 moved to Invergordon to patrol the North Sea between Scotland and Norway. From October 1939 it patrolled the Atlantic from Oban. Two further re-equipments occurred, in December 1939 (Saro Lerwicks) and then in April 1941 (Consolidated Catalinas). Familiarisation with the U.S. supplied Catalinas was aided by the secondment of U.S. military personnel who also flew on active service patrols, despite the U.S. being a neutral power at the time. Anti-submarine patrols were flown over the Atlantic from RAF Castle Archdale on Lough Erne, in Northern Ireland, using the Donegal Corridor over neutral Eire. During this time, in May 1941, a patrol by No.209 (with an American crewman) located the German battleship Bismarck.

In August 1941, the squadron moved to Iceland for two months. From March 1942 until July 1945, No.209 was stationed in East Africa. It flew patrols over the Indian Ocean with detached bases in South Africa, Madagascar, Oman and the Seychelles to extend its cover. In July 1945 the squadron moved to Ceylon (now Sri Lanka), with recently acquired Short Sunderland MkVs, with a detachment at Rangoon (now Yangon), to harass Japanese shipping along the coast from Burma (now Myanmar) to Malaya.

Post war

Hong Kong and Seletar
After the Japanese surrender in August 1945, a detachment was sent to Hong Kong in September, followed by the rest of the squadron in October. In April 1946 the squadron moved to Singapore. A detachment remained at RAF Kai Tak and became No.1430 flight and then No.88 Squadron. The squadron headquarters was established at RAF Seletar (sometimes referred to as "Seltar"), on Singapore Island on 18 May 1946 and No.209 and was named "City of Hong Kong" Squadron on 23 January 1947.

To Korea
Operation Firedog missions during the Malayan Emergency began on 7 July 1948. In September 1950, during the Korean War, the aircraft were moved to Iwakuni, Yamaguchi, Japan to patrol off the Korean coast from 15 September. On 1 January 1955 the squadron merged with No. 205 Squadron.

With Pioneers in the transport role
On 1 November 1958 No. 267 Squadron at RAF Kuala Lumpur was renumbered 209 Squadron and flew Scottish Aviation Pioneers and Scottish Aviation Twin Pioneers on liaison and transport duties in Malaysia. No.209 Squadron was finally disbanded on 31 December 1968 at RAF Seletar.

Notable personnel
 Fred Everest Banbury – 1917–1918 with No. 9 Naval Squadron
 Arthur Roy Brown
 Stearne Tighe Edwards
 Air chief marshal Robert Foster – 1918
 John Hales
 Oliver Colin LeBoutillier 
 Wilfrid May
 Air vice-marshal Francis Mellersh
 John Paynter – 1917 with No. 9
 Oliver Redgate – 1917–1918
 Merrill Samuel Taylor – 1917–1918 with No. 9 and No. 209

Aircraft operated

Squadron bases

See also
List of Royal Air Force aircraft squadrons

References

Footnotes

Bibliography 

 Bowyer, Michael J.F and John D.R. Rawlings. Squadron Codes, 1937–56. Cambridge, Cambridgeshire, UK: Patrick Stephens Ltd, 1979. .
 Flintham, Vic and Andrew Thomas. Combat Codes: A Full Explanation and Listing of British, Commonwealth and Allied Air Force Unit Codes Since 1938. Shrewsbury, Shropshire, UK: Airlife Publishing, 2003. .
 Halley, James J. The Squadrons of the Royal Air Force & Commonwealth, 1918–1988. Tonbridge, Kent, UK: Air-Britain (Historians), 1988. .
 Jefford, C.G. RAF Squadrons, a Comprehensive Record of the Movement and Equipment of all RAF Squadrons and their Antecedents since 1912. Shrewsbury: Airlife Publishing, 2001. .
 Kennedy, Ludovic. Pursuit: The Sinking of the "Bismarck". London: Book Club Associates, 1975.
 Lewis, Peter. Squadron Histories: R.F.C, R.N.A.S and R.A.F., 1912–59. London: Putnam, 1959.
 Rawlings, John D.R. Coastal, Support and Special Squadrons of the RAF and their Aircraft. London: Jane's Publishing Company, 1982. .
 Rawlings, John D.R. Fighter Squadrons of the RAF and their Aircraft. London: Macdonald and Jane's (Publishers), 1969 (new edition 1976, reprinted 1978). .
 Shores, Christopher; Franks, Norman; Guest, Russel. Above the Trenches: A Complete Record of the Fighter Aces and Units of the British Empire Air Forces 1915–1920.  Oxford: Grub Street, 1990. , .

External links

  No. 209 Squadron Coastal Command deployments

Military units and formations established in 1917
09
209 Squadron
Military of Hong Kong under British rule
Military units and formations of the Royal Air Force in World War I
Aircraft squadrons of the Royal Air Force in World War II
Military units and formations disestablished in 1968
1917 establishments in France